Nave Sha'anan (lit. Tranquil Abode)  is a neighborhood in eastern Haifa, Israel that extends from the lower inclines of Mount Carmel to midway across its slopes.

History
Nave Sha'anan was founded in 1922. The name is based on a verse in the Bible (Isaiah 33:20). The main  campus of the Technion is located in Nave Sha'anan. 

In 2004, Nave Sha'anan had a population of 38,100, accounting for 14% of the city's total population. Smaller neighborhoods in Neve Sha'anan include Yad Labanim, Hanita, HaTikhon and Asher. Housing in Neve Sha'anan is much in demand by students and faculty of the Technion.

The Grand Canyon shopping mall is located in Neve Sha'anan (the name is a play on words, since "Kanyon" means mall in Hebrew, and the mall is located in a canyon).

References

External links 
Official website of the municipality of Haifa

Neighborhoods of Haifa